Philip Edward Judd (8 April 1934 – 14 June 2015) was an  international rugby union player and captain.

Judd was capped twenty-two times for England as a prop between 1963 and 1966. He captained England in his last five internationals, including the 1967 Five Nations Championship.

Judd began his rugby career playing for Broadstreet RFC before progressing to play for his city side Coventry.

References

1934 births
2015 deaths
English rugby union players
England international rugby union players
Rugby union props